Hebius  nigriventer is a species of snake of the family Colubridae. The snake is found in Myanmar and China.

References 

nigriventer
Reptiles of Myanmar
Reptiles of China
Reptiles described in 1925
Taxa named by Frank Wall